The Draconic Prophecies is a series of books by James Wyatt and published by Wizards of the Coast.  It consists of three books: Storm Dragon, Dragon Forge, and Dragon War.

References

Eberron novels
Fantasy novel series